There have been various accounts of persons who allegedly travelled through time reported by the press or circulated on the Internet. These reports have turned out either to be hoaxes or to be based on incorrect assumptions, incomplete information, or interpretation of fiction as fact, many being now recognized as urban legends.

Alleged time travelers

Charlotte Anne Moberly and Eleanor Jourdain

In 1911, Charlotte Anne Moberly (1846–1937) and Eleanor Jourdain (1863–1924) published a book entitled An Adventure, under the names of "Elizabeth Morison" and "Frances Lamont". They described a visit to the Petit Trianon, a small château in the grounds of the Palace of Versailles, where they claimed they saw ghosts including Marie Antoinette and others. Their story caused a sensation, and was subject to much ridicule.

"Chaplin's Time Traveller"

In October 2010, Northern Irish filmmaker George Clarke uploaded a video clip entitled "Chaplin's Time Traveller" to YouTube. The clip analyzes bonus material in a DVD of the Charlie Chaplin film The Circus. Included in the DVD is footage from the film's Los Angeles premiere at Grauman's Chinese Theatre in 1928. At one point, a woman is seen walking by, holding up an object to her ear. Clarke said that, on closer examination, she was talking into a thin, black device that had appeared to be a "phone". Clarke concluded that the woman was possibly a time traveller. The clip received millions of hits and was the subject of televised news stories.

Nicholas Jackson, associate editor for The Atlantic, says the most likely answer is that she was using a portable hearing aid, a technology that was just being developed at the time. Philip Skroska, an archivist at the Bernard Becker Medical Library of Washington University School of Medicine, thought that the woman might have been holding a rectangular ear trumpet. New York Daily News writer Michael Sheridan said the device was probably an early hearing aid, perhaps an Acousticon manufactured by Miller Reese Hutchison.

Present-day hipster at 1941 bridge opening

A photograph from 1941 of genuine authenticity of the re-opening of the South Fork Bridge in Gold Bridge, British Columbia was alleged to show a time traveler. It was claimed that his clothing and sunglasses were of the present day and not of the styles worn in the '40s, while his camera was anachronistically small.

Further research suggested that the present-day appearance of the man would not have necessarily been out of place in 1941. The style of sunglasses he is wearing first appeared in the 1920s. On first glance the man is taken by many to be wearing a printed T-shirt, but on closer inspection it seems to be a sweater with a sewn-on emblem, the kind of clothing often worn by sports teams of the period. The shirt is very similar to the one that was used by the Montreal Maroons, an ice hockey team from that era. The remainder of his clothing would appear to have been available at the time, though his clothes are far more casual than those worn by the other individuals in the photograph. His camera is smaller than most of that era, but cameras of that size did exist; while it is unclear what make his camera was, Kodak had manufactured portable cameras of equivalent size since 1938.

The "Time Traveling Hipster" became a case study in viral Internet phenomena which was presented at the Museums and the Web 2011 conference in Philadelphia.

Mobile device in 1943
A photograph from 1943 of genuine authenticity, showing a scene of holidaymakers on Towan Beach in Newquay, Cornwall, was uploaded to Twitter in November 2018 by multimedia artist Stuart Humphryes, which was alleged by some viewers to show a time traveller operating an anachronistic mobile device, such as a phone. This tweet was picked up by news outlets including Fox News in the US, and various tabloid newspapers in the UK, such as The Daily Mirror. Fuelled by media websites such as LADbible it gained global coverage via news outlets in Russia, Iran, Taiwan, Hungary, China and Vietnam. amongst others. Humphryes, the original uploader, was quoted in these stories as dismissing the time travel theories, stating that the man in question was probably just rolling a cigarette.

Rudolph Fentz

The story of Rudolph Fentz is an urban legend from the early 1950s and has been repeated since as a reproduction of facts and presented as evidence for the existence of time travel. The essence of the legend is that in New York City in 1951 a man wearing 19th-century clothes was hit by a car. The subsequent investigation revealed that the man had disappeared without a trace in 1876. The items in his possession suggested that the man had traveled through time from 1876 to 1951 directly.

The folklorist Chris Aubeck investigated the story and found it originated in a science fiction book of the 1950s, A Voice from the Gallery by  Ralph M. Holland, which had copied the tale from "I'm Scared", a short story by Jack Finney (1911–1995).

John Titor

Between 2000 and 2001, an online bulletin board user self-identified as John Titor became popular as he claimed to be a time traveler from 2036 on a military mission. Holding the many-worlds interpretation as correct and consequently every time travel paradox as impossible, he stated that many events which occurred up to his time would indeed occur in this timeline. These included a devastating civil war in the US in 2008 followed by a short nuclear World War III in 2015, which will "kill three billion people".

In the years following his last posts and disappearance in 2001, the non-fulfilment of his specific predictions made his popularity decrease. Criticism has pointed out flaws in Titor's stories and investigations suggested his character may be a hoax and a creation of two siblings from Florida.

The story has been retold on numerous web sites, in a book, in the Japanese visual novel/anime Steins;Gate, and in a play. He may also have been discussed occasionally on the radio show Coast to Coast AM. In this respect, the Titor story may be unique in terms of broad appeal from an originally limited medium, an Internet discussion board.

Bob White/Tim Jones
Similar to John Titor, Bob White or Tim Jones sent an unknown number of spam emails onto the internet between 2001 and 2003. The subject of the emails was always the same: that an individual was seeking to find someone who could supply a "Dimensional Warp Generator." In some instances, he claimed to be a time traveler stuck in 2003, and in others he claimed to be seeking the parts only from other time travelers. Several recipients began to respond in kind, claiming to have equipment such as the requested dimensional warp generator. One recipient, Dave Hill, set up an online shop from which the time traveler purchased the warp generator (formerly a Hard Drive Motor), while another Dave charged thousands of dollars for time-travel "courses" before he would sell the requested hardware.

The name "Bob White" was taken from an alias that the second Dave used when responding (a reference to the "Bobwhites" of Trixie Belden-fame).
Soon afterward, the time traveler was identified as professional spammer Robert J. Todino (known as "Robby"). Todino's attempts to travel in time were a serious belief, and while he believed he was "perfectly mentally stable," his father was concerned that those replying to his emails had been preying on Todino's psychological problems.

In his book Spam Kings, journalist Brian S. McWilliams, who had originally uncovered Todino's identity for Wired magazine, revealed that Todino had been previously diagnosed with dissociative disorder and schizophrenia, explaining the psychological problems of which his father had spoken. Todino's time traveller was referenced in the song "Rewind" by jazz trio Groovelily on their 2003 album Are we there yet? The song used phrases taken from Todino's emails within its lyrics.

Andrew Carlssin
Andrew Carlssin was supposedly arrested in March 2003 for SEC violations for making 126 high-risk stock trades and being successful on every one. As reported, Carlssin started with an initial investment of $800 and ended with over $350,000,000 which drew the attention of the SEC. Later reports suggest that after his arrest, he submitted a four-hour confession wherein he claimed to be a time traveler from 200 years in the future. He offered to tell investigators such things as the whereabouts of Osama bin Laden and the cure for AIDS in return for a lesser punishment and to be allowed to return to his time craft, although he refused to tell investigators the location or workings of his craft. A mysterious man posted his bail and Carlssin was scheduled for court hearing but was never seen again; records show that he never existed.

The Carlssin story likely originated as a fictional piece in Weekly World News, a satirical newspaper, and was later repeated by Yahoo! News, where its fictitious nature became less apparent. It was soon reported by other newspapers and magazines as fact. This in turn drove word-of-mouth spread through email inboxes and internet forums, leading to far more detailed descriptions of events.

Håkan Nordkvist
A video uploaded in 2006 shows a Swedish man named Håkan Nordkvist claiming that he had been accidentally transported to 2046 when attempting to fix the sink in his kitchen. There in the future, he immediately met someone who revealed and proved to be himself about 70 years old, and with whom he "had a great time". He filmed a short footage of the two smiling and hugging each other and showing the tattoo they had on their right arms. The story was a marketing campaign promoting the pension plans of the insurance company AMF.

iPhone in an 1860 painting 

Some online viewers claimed that an 1860 painting by Austrian artist Ferdinand Georg Waldmüller titled The Expected allegedly depicted a woman holding and staring down at an iPhone while strolling along a path in the countryside. However, art experts debunked these claims and stated that the alleged iPhone the woman was holding in the painting was actually a prayer book.

Mike Marcum
In 1995, a man named as Mike “Madman” Marcum reportedly claimed to have built a time-machine in his home. In 1997, he reportedly disappeared (after few days of limelight) and was never heard of again. His tale is also mentioned in audible and SoundCloud.

Alleged time-travel technology

Die Glocke

Die Glocke ("The Bell") is a purported Nazi time machine that was supposedly part of a flying saucer.

The Chronovisor
Italian Benedictine monk  claimed to have used a time viewer which could film the past without sound called a chronovisor to obtain a photograph of the Crucifixion of Jesus and view scenes from ancient Rome, including a performance of the lost play Thyestes. According to author Paul J. Nahin, a short story by Horace Gold called "The Biography Project" published in Galaxy Science Fiction magazine may have influenced Ernetti's claim. According to Guardian writer Mark Pilkington, "Ernetti's glory was shortlived. Another magazine revealed that Christ was a reversed image of a postcard from the Santuario dell'Amore Misericordioso, in the town of Collevalenza. More recently, doubt has been cast on his "transcription" of Thyestes, and an apparent deathbed confession has also surfaced."

Iranian time machine
In April 2013, the Iranian news agency Fars carried a story claiming a 27-year-old Iranian scientist had invented a time machine that allowed people to see into the future. A few days later, the story was removed, and replaced with a story quoting an Iranian government official that no such device had been registered.

Philadelphia Experiment and Montauk Project

The Philadelphia Experiment is the name given to a naval military experiment which was supposedly carried out at the Philadelphia Naval Shipyard in Philadelphia, Pennsylvania, USA, sometime around October 28, 1943. It is alleged that the U.S. Navy destroyer escort USS Eldridge was to be rendered invisible (or "cloaked") to enemy devices. The experiment is also referred to as Project Rainbow. Some reports allege that the warship travelled back in time for about 10 seconds; however, popular culture has represented far bigger time jumps.

The story is widely regarded as a hoax. The U.S. Navy maintains that no such experiment occurred, and details of the story contradict well-established facts about the Eldridge as well as the known laws of physics.

The Montauk Project was alleged to be a series of secret United States government projects conducted at Camp Hero or Montauk Air Force Station on Montauk, Long Island, for the purpose of exotic research, including time travel. Jacques Vallée describes allegations of the Montauk Project as an outgrowth of stories about the Philadelphia Experiment.

References

Hoaxes in science
Time travel
Urban legends